Fernando Martínez (born February 4, 1991 in Monterrey, Nuevo León) is a Mexican professional footballer who plays for Sonora  of Ascenso MX.

External links
Ascenso MX 

Liga MX players
Mexican footballers
Sportspeople from Monterrey
Association footballers not categorized by position
1991 births
Living people